Bluffton, originally known as Shannon, is a village in Allen and Hancock counties in the U.S. state of Ohio.  The population was 4,125 at the 2010 census. Bluffton is home to Bluffton University, a four-year educational institution affiliated with Mennonite Church USA. Bluffton is served by the Bluffton general aviation airport. Bluffton participates in the Tree City USA program.

The Allen County portion of Bluffton is part of the Lima Metropolitan Statistical Area, while the Hancock County portion is part of the Findlay Micropolitan Statistical Area.

Geography
Bluffton is located at  (40.893881, -83.891605).

Riley Creek flows through Bluffton.

Demographics

2010 census
As of the census of 2010, there were 4,125 people, 1,428 households, and 913 families living in the village. The racial makeup of the village was 95.3% White, 1.6% African American, 0.2% Native American, 0.9% Asian, 0.8% from other races, and 1.2% from two or more races. Hispanic or Latino of any race were 1.5% of the population.

There were 1,428 households, of which 29.5% had children under the age of 18 living with them, 53.4% were married couples living together, 8.1% had a female householder with no husband present, 2.5% had a male householder with no wife present, and 36.1% were non-families. 33.2% of all households were made up of individuals, and 18.3% had someone living alone who was 65 years of age or older. The average household size was 2.31 and the average family size was 2.95.

The median age in the village was 34 years. 19.9% of residents were under the age of 18; 21.8% were between the ages of 18 and 24; 19.2% were from 25 to 44; 20% were from 45 to 64; and 19% were 65 years of age or older. The gender makeup of the village was 45.6% male and 54.4% female.

2000 census
As of the census of 2000, there were 3,896 people, 1,329 households, and 851 families living in the village. The population density was 1,170.2 people per square mile (451.7/km2). There were 1,427 housing units at an average density of 428.6 per square mile (165.5/km2). The racial makeup of the village was 97.82% White, 0.77% African American, 0.05% Native American, 0.54% Asian, 0.18% from other races, and 0.64% from two or more races. Hispanic or Latino of any race were 1.18% of the population.

There were 1,329 households, out of which 28.3% had children under the age of 18 living with them, 54.3% were married couples living together, 7.3% had a female householder with no husband present, and 35.9% were non-families. 33.1% of all households were made up of individuals, and 18.9% had someone living alone who was 65 years of age or older. The average household size was 2.32 and the average family size was 2.99.

In the village, the population was spread out, with 19.7% under the age of 18, 22.3% from 18 to 24, 21.3% from 25 to 44, 16.8% from 45 to 64, and 20.0% who were 65 years of age or older. The median age was 33 years. For every 100 females there were 76.4 males. For every 100 females age 18 and over, there were 73.4 males.

The median income for a household in the village was $43,208, and the median income for a family was $54,948. Males had a median income of $40,208 versus $21,563 for females. The per capita income for the village was $18,711. About 4.9% of families and 5.7% of the population were below the poverty line, including 3.6% of those under age 18 and 10.6% of those age 65 or over.

History
The village was founded in 1831 by Swiss Mennonites, German Reformists and Irish Catholics. It was originally named 'Crogan's Corners' after the postmaster. When the citizens chose to incorporate as a village, the Irish suggested the name 'Shannon' because of the green fields around the area. As there was already a village named Shannon in the state, the town was renamed Bluffton for the hilly terrain of the town site.

Bank robber John Dillinger robbed the Bluffton Bank (now known as Citizens National Bank of Bluffton) of $6,000 on August 14, 1933.

In 2011, Bluffton celebrated its 150th birthday with a series of town-wide events.

WBWH-LP (96.1 FM) serves the Bluffton community as its only full-time radio station.

Education

Elementary and secondary
Bluffton High School sports participate in the Northwest Conference, an athletic body sanctioned by the Ohio High School Athletic Association (OHSAA) which includes the Ada Bulldogs, Allen East Mustangs, Bluffton Pirates, Columbus Grove Bulldogs, Convoy Crestview Knights, Delphos Jefferson Wildcats, Lincolnview Lancers, Paulding Panthers, and Spencerville Bearcats.

Higher education
Bluffton is home to Bluffton University, a four-year educational institution affiliated with the Mennonite Church USA.

Economy
Bluffton is located approximately halfway between Lima and Findlay in northwest Ohio along Interstate 75.

One of the oldest companies in the village is the Bluffton Slaw Cutter Company, which has been making a unique food grater/cutter designed in 1915. The company makes several variations of the product using equipment of the same vintage as the design.

Modern manufacturing in Bluffton includes the international firm SumiRiko (formerly DTR), a cooperative venture between Duramax and Tokai Rubber of Japan, that makes rubber components for the auto industry. GROB Systems, a division of the German company GROB Group, produces machining and automation systems at its plant in Bluffton. Diamond Manufacturing of Bluffton produces metalwork and leases warehousing space.

The downtown area is anchored by the 19th century town hall and includes a local farmers market on Saturday mornings from May through October. With an average of 20 vendors, shoppers can choose from local foods and produce, as well as potted herbs, annuals, perennials, shrubs, and trees.

Ten Thousand Villages is a fair-trade retailer that was founded in Bluffton. The shop sells products made by artisans in developing countries.

The Shannon Theatre is a movie theater in the downtown area. Right next door is the original Shirley's Gourmet Popcorn, a franchise founded in Bluffton after people came to the theater just to buy popcorn. Other leisure opportunities are the Bluffton University nature preserve, Motter Metro Park, Bluffton Family Recreation Center, a bike and pedestrian pathway, and Southgate Lanes.

Notable people
 Tommy Boutwell, American football player
 John Travis: Doctor and pioneer in the Wellness movement was born in Bluffton.
 Joe Schriner, presidential candidate
 Tobias Buckell, science fiction writer
 D. Michael Crites, United States Attorney for the Southern District of Ohio in the administrations of President Ronald Reagan and George H.W. Bush
 Larry Cox, Major League baseball player
 James McIntire, Washington state treasurer

Annual activities

Blaze of Lights Festival - Saturday after Thanksgiving
National Night Out - Early August
 Festival of Wheels Car Show - June
Bluffton Arts & Crafts Festival - First Saturday in June
 Trout Derby - first Sunday in May
 Ride to Remember - Annual 100 mile bicycle ride organized by the Bluffton Lion's club.

References

External links

 
Villages in Allen County, Ohio
Villages in Hancock County, Ohio
Villages in Ohio
Populated places established in 1831
1831 establishments in Ohio